This is a list of arcade games that have used a trackball to interact with the game.

World Cup (Sega, March 1978)
Atari Football (Atari, October 1978)
Shuffleboard (Midway Manufacturing, October 1978)
Atari Soccer (1979)
Atari Baseball (1979)
BullsEye (1980)
Centipede (1980)
Extra Bases (1980)
Missile Command (1980)
Kick (a.k.a. Kick Man) (1981)
Laser Base (1981)
Beezer (1982)
Millipede (1982)
Liberator (1982)
Quantum (1982)
Reactor (1982)
Slither (1982)
Birdie King (1982)
Birdie King 2 (1983)
Cloud 9 (1983)
Crystal Castles (1983)
Track and Field (1983; later versions used buttons)
Wacko (1983)
Birdie King 3 (1984)
Cube Quest (1984)
Goalie Ghost (1984)
Bouncer (1984)
Marble Madness (1984)
Snake Pit (1984)
Gimme A Break (1985)
Tehkan Gridiron Fight (1985)
Tehkan World Cup (1985)
Mini Golf (1985)
Big Event Golf (1986)
Blades of Steel (1987)
Combat School / Boot Camp (1987)
Cabal (1988; trackball used only in early editions)
Capcom Bowling (1988)
Syvalion (1988)
Ameri Darts (1989)
Coors Light Bowling (1989)
U.S. Classic (1989)
Tri-Sports (1989)
American Horseshoes (1990)
Shuuz (1990)
Strata Bowling (1990)
Ataxx (1990)
Rampart (1990)
Golden Tee Golf (1990)
Bowl-O-Rama (1991)
Golden Tee Golf II (1992)
SegaSonic The Hedgehog (1993)
Golden Tee 3D Golf (1995)
Shuffleshot (1997)
World Class Bowling (1997)
Outtrigger (1999)
The Simpsons Bowling (2000)
Beach head 2000 (2000)
Golden Tee Fore! (2000)
The Grid (2001)
 Hyperbowl--Hyper Entertainment; uses a bowling ball sized trackball (circa 2000)
Silver Strike Bowling (2004)
Rockin' Bowl-O-Rama (2005)
Golden Tee LIVE! (2005)
Virtua Bowling (IGS)
Target Toss Pro
The irritating Maze
Super Monkey Ball - Ticket Blitz (2009)
Marine Date (1981)
Temple Run 2 (2014)

References

Trackball Arcade